The arrondissement of Grasse is an arrondissement of France in the Alpes-Maritimes department in the Provence-Alpes-Côte d'Azur region. It has 62 communes.

Composition

The communes of the arrondissement of Grasse, and their INSEE codes, are:

 Aiglun (06001)
 Amirat (06002)
 Andon (06003)
 Antibes (06004)
 Auribeau-sur-Siagne (06007)
 Le Bar-sur-Loup (06010)
 Bézaudun-les-Alpes (06017)
 Biot (06018)
 Bouyon (06022)
 Briançonnet (06024)
 Le Broc (06025)
 Cabris (06026)
 Cagnes-sur-Mer (06027)
 Caille (06028)
 Cannes (06029)
 Le Cannet (06030)
 Carros (06033)
 Caussols (06037)
 Châteauneuf-Grasse (06038)
 Cipières (06041)
 La Colle-sur-Loup (06044)
 Collongues (06045)
 Conségudes (06047)
 Courmes (06049)
 Coursegoules (06050)
 Escragnolles (06058)
 Les Ferres (06061)
 Gars (06063)
 Gattières (06064)
 La Gaude (06065)
 Gourdon (06068)
 Grasse (06069)
 Gréolières (06070)
 Mandelieu-la-Napoule (06079)
 Le Mas (06081)
 Mouans-Sartoux (06084)
 Mougins (06085)
 Les Mujouls (06087)
 Opio (06089)
 Pégomas (06090)
 Peymeinade (06095)
 La Roque-en-Provence (06107)
 Roquefort-les-Pins (06105)
 La Roquette-sur-Siagne (06108)
 Le Rouret (06112)
 Saint-Auban (06116)
 Saint-Cézaire-sur-Siagne (06118)
 Saint-Jeannet (06122)
 Saint-Laurent-du-Var (06123)
 Saint-Paul (06128)
 Saint-Vallier-de-Thiey (06130)
 Sallagriffon (06131)
 Séranon (06134)
 Spéracèdes (06137)
 Théoule-sur-Mer (06138)
 Le Tignet (06140)
 Tourrettes-sur-Loup (06148)
 Valbonne (06152)
 Valderoure (06154)
 Vallauris (06155)
 Vence (06157)
 Villeneuve-Loubet (06161)

History

The arrondissement of Grasse was created in 1800 as part of the department Var. In 1860 it became part of the department Alpes-Maritimes.

As a result of the reorganisation of the cantons of France which came into effect in 2015, the borders of the cantons are no longer related to the borders of the arrondissements. The cantons of the arrondissement of Grasse were, as of January 2015:

 Antibes-Biot
 Antibes-Centre
 Le Bar-sur-Loup
 Cagnes-sur-Mer-Centre
 Cagnes-sur-Mer-Ouest
 Cannes-Centre
 Cannes-Est
 Le Cannet
 Carros
 Coursegoules
 Grasse-Nord
 Grasse-Sud
 Mandelieu-Cannes-Ouest
 Mougins
 Saint-Auban
 Saint-Laurent-du-Var-Cagnes-sur-Mer-Est
 Saint-Vallier-de-Thiey
 Vallauris-Antibes-Ouest
 Vence

References

Grasse
Grasse